Ibrahim biro (Kurdish: Ibrahîm Biro), (Arabic: إبراهيم برو) head of the Yekiti Kurdistan Party - Syria, from March 2013 to late December 2018. Born in the city of Amouda July 7, 1965 of the Syrian province of Hasakah. He received his high school diploma from the city's high school and continued his studies at the Intermediate Institute of Railways in Aleppo in 1985. To work as a civil servant at the Syrian Railways Corporation one year after graduating.

Political activity 
Syrian regime forces arrested BİRO in 1993 in the city of Amouda, in the province of Hasakah, as a result of his political work among the Kurdish movement in Syria. In 2009 he was again arrested by the Syrian security forces and sentenced to eight months in prison. In March 2011, when the Syrian anti-Syrian demonstrations reached northern Syria, Syrian security forces arrested "Biro" for his participation in the current demonstrations. He was sentenced to 11 months in prison and released in March 2012. He was a member of the Kurdish Shegile Party in Syria (حزب الشغيلّة الكردي) in 1982. He was elected a member of the Central Committee of the Yekiti Kurdistan Party - Syria at his third conference in 2000 and was also elected a member of the political bureau of the Yekiti party in 2006. He was elected secretary of the party at his seventh conference in mid-March 2013, where he held the position until December 23, 2018. He served as president of the Kurdish National Council in Syria and its military wing the Peshmerga Roj, which includes 13 parties of the Syrian Kurdish parties and a number of women's and youth organizations and independent figures opposed to the Syrian regime In 2013, representing all the mass In the National Coalition for Syrian Revolutionary and Opposition Forces.

He was elected as secretary of the Yekiti Kurdistan Party - Syria at the 7th Congress in mid-March 2013 to 23 December 2018 through the 8th Congress of the Party.

He was elected President of the Kurdish National Council in Syria in 2015, to 11 December 2017

Abduction and exile 
Biro was kidnapped by the Asayish forces of the Democratic Union Party of the Syrian branch of the PKK on August 13, 2016, in the market of the city of Qamishli, where he took him to an unknown destination to the dawn of the next day and his cross outside the Syrian border to the Kurdistan Region of Iraq. After receiving several threats by the leaders and members of the Democratic Union Party, to decide the other exile outside Syria.

References 

living people
1965 births
People from Al-Hasakah Governorate
Syrian politicians